Alessandro Antine Nivola (born June 28, 1972) is an American actor. He has been nominated for a Tony Award and an Independent Spirit Award and has won a Screen Actors Guild Award, a British Independent Film Award (BIFA), and the Best Actor Award at the 2017 Tribeca Film Festival among others.

As a producer he runs King Bee Productions which made two seasons of the HBO comedy Doll & Em and the Independent Spirit Award nominated feature film To Dust.

Early life
Nivola was born in Boston, Massachusetts. His mother, Virginia (née Davis), is an artist, and his father, Pietro Salvatore Nivola, was a professor of political science and a senior fellow at The Brookings Institution. Nivola's paternal grandfather was the Italian sculptor Costantino Nivola, and his paternal grandmother, Ruth Guggenheim, was a Jewish refugee from Germany. He was born the first of two boys; his brother, Adrian Nivola, a painter, is five years younger. Nivola attended Phillips Exeter Academy and Yale University. His family also lived in Burlington, Vermont, where he attended Mater Christi School, a ministry of the Sisters of Mercy.

Career
Nivola graduated from Yale University with a BA in English in 1994 and a year later made his Broadway debut opposite Helen Mirren in A Month in the Country earning a Drama Desk Award nomination. Shortly after that came his breakthrough performance in John Woo's feature film Face/Off (1997) playing Nicolas Cage's brother Pollux Troy. In the ensuing years he has starred in many films including Mansfield Park (1999), Love's Labour's Lost (2000), Jurassic Park 3 (2001), Laurel Canyon (2002), Junebug (2005), Goal! 1 & 2 (2005, 2007), Coco Before Chanel (2009), Ginger & Rosa (2012), American Hustle (2013), A Most Violent Year (2014), Selma (2014), The Neon Demon (2016), One Percent More Humid (2017), You Were Never Really Here (2017), Disobedience (2017), The Art of Self Defense (2019), and The Red Sea Diving Resort (2019).

He played Dickie Moltisanti, the lead role in The Many Saints of Newark, David Chase's feature film prequel to his heralded television series The Sopranos. In 2022, he appeared in  David O. Russell's Amsterdam opposite Christian Bale and Margot Robbie, as well as the comedy feature Spin Me Round opposite Alison Brie and Aubrey Plaza.

Nivola has also worked frequently in television, starring opposite Robert De Niro in Barry Levinson's Madoff family biopic The Wizard of Lies (2017), as well as the TNT miniseries The Company (2007), the UK Channel 4 series Chimerica (2019), and the three-part BBC miniseries Black Narcissus, broadcast 27, 28, and 29 December 2020.

Onstage, in addition to A Month in the Country, he starred on Broadway in 2013 in The Winslow Boy and in 2014 in The Elephant Man opposite Bradley Cooper (Tony Award nomination), and off-Broadway in the Ethan Hawke-directed Sam Shepard play A Lie of the Mind (2010) with Laurie Metcalf. He also starred opposite Gwyneth Paltrow in the 1995 Williamstown Theater Festival production of Shakespeare's As You Like It.

In 2013 Nivola established King Bee Productions with his wife Emily Mortimer. The company produced two seasons of the half hour comedy Doll & Em for HBO and BSkyB. He also produced To Dust starring Matthew Broderick which won the Audience Award at the 2018 Tribeca Film Festival and was nominated for a 2020 Independent Spirit Award.

In March 2022, it was announced that Nivola was cast in Sony's Kraven the Hunter film, set for release on January 13, 2023. He will reportedly play the film's antagonist.

Personal life
Nivola married British actress Emily Mortimer in Buckinghamshire in January 2003. The couple have a son, Sam born 26 September 2003 and daughter, May born 2010 and live in Boerum Hill, Brooklyn. Sam and May play brother and sister in the 2022 Netflix film White Noise as the children of characters played by Adam Driver and Greta Gerwig. Mortimer became an American citizen.

Filmography

Awards and nominations

References

External links
 
 
 

1972 births
20th-century American male actors
21st-century American male actors
American male film actors
American male Shakespearean actors
American male stage actors
American male television actors
American people of German-Jewish descent
American people of Italian descent
People of Sardinian descent
American expatriates in England
Living people
Male actors from Boston
Outstanding Performance by a Cast in a Motion Picture Screen Actors Guild Award winners
People from Echo Park, Los Angeles
Phillips Exeter Academy alumni
Yale University alumni
People from Boerum Hill, Brooklyn
Mortimer family (drama)
Naturalised citizens of the United Kingdom